Solvej Balle (born 16 August 1962 in Bovrup, Sønderjylland) is a Danish writer.

Biography
She was born in Bovrup, Sønderjylland and studied literature and philosophy at the University of Copenhagen. In 1984, she published her first novel Lyrefugl (The Lyre Bird). Balle has travelled through Europe, Australia, the United States and Canada. She attended Forfatterskolen (writer's school) between 1987 and 1989. In 1996, she became editor of the literary journal Den blå port. She wrote &, a book of short prose that was published in 1990. Her 1993 group of stories Ifølge loven, fire beretninger om mennesket (According to the law: Four Stories about Humankind) earned her international recognition.

She was co-author of the 1989 radio play Et netværk af stemmer, from a draft by Jens Christian Grøndahl. In 1992, with Anne Marie Dinesen and Christian Dorph, she translated Rosmarie Waldrop's The Reproduction of Profiles into Danish as Gengivelse af profiler. Balle published a collection of poems Eller in 1998.

Other works 
 Det umuliges kunst (2005), art theory
 Det umuliges kunst (2008), memoirs and observations

References 

1962 births
Living people
Danish women novelists
20th-century Danish translators
21st-century Danish translators
People from Sønderborg Municipality
21st-century Danish women writers
Danish women memoirists
21st-century translators
Danish women poets
20th-century Danish poets
20th-century Danish women writers
20th-century Danish novelists
English–Danish translators
Danish memoirists